Sideshow Collectibles is an American specialty manufacturer of movie, film, television and collectible action figures, statues, and high end pieces. Sideshow's licenses include Star Wars, DC Comics, Marvel Comics, The Lord of the Rings, Disney, Harry Potter, Masters of the Universe, Pokémon, Dragon Ball Z, Street Fighter, Game of Thrones, and Star Trek.

Sideshow Collectibles is also the exclusive distributor of Hot Toys collectible figures in the United States, North and South America, Europe, Australia and throughout most Asian countries. It is also an official distributor of Iron Studios statues in United States territory.

History 
Sideshow Collectibles was established in 1994. It originally created toy prototypes for major toy companies such as Mattel, Galoob and Wild Planet. In 1999, Sideshow began marketing its own line of collectible and specialty products under the Sideshow brand, beginning with the Universal Classic Monsters 8" Action Figure license, which sold through Toys R Us and other mass market retailers. The company then began creating items in the sixth scale format that sold through specialty markets, at which time Sideshow switched their name from "toys" to "collectibles".

Sideshow Collectibles currently partners with Marvel, Disney, DreamWorks, WB, Lucasfilm, DC, Blizzard Entertainment, and others to create products drawn from the Marvel Universe, the DC Universe, Star Wars, Alien & Predator, Terminator, The Lord of the Rings, G.I. Joe, Halo, World of Warcraft, Star Craft II, Mass Effect 3, Diablo 3, and many more. Sideshow Collectibles' products are currently sold in specialty, trend, collectible and comic shops both in the US and internationally, as well as online directly through Sideshow Collectibles.

Production 
A collectible at Sideshow starts out with conceptual art, which may be several layers deep. Then sculpting begins, primarily with traditional clay or wax sculpture tools. Digital rendering programs are also used, which are printed out in a rapid prototyping machine. The output is taken into the sculpture pool, and then cleaned up to bring in an additional layer of detail by human hand. 90% of the collectibles Sideshow makes are licensed properties.

Licensed properties

 James Bond 
 Friday the 13th 
 Ghost Rider 
 Indiana Jones and the Kingdom of the Crystal Skull 
 Jaws 
 Jurassic Park 
 Spider-Man 3 
 Star Wars 
 Teenage Mutant Ninja Turtles 
 Terminator 2: Judgment Day 
 Terminator Salvation 
 Transformers: Revenge of the Fallen 
 Tremors 
 Tron: Evolution 
 How To Train Your Dragon
 How To Train Your Dragon 2
 Kung Fu Panda
 Star Trek
 Monty Python and the Holy Grail
 Monty Python's Life of Brian

DC Comics

 Batman
 Catwoman
 Wonder Woman
 Green Lantern
 Harley Quinn
 The Joker
 Deathstroke
 Poison Ivy
 Superman
 Aquaman
 Darkseid
 Huntress
 Green Arrow
 Swamp Thing
 Killer Croc

Marvel Comics

 Deadpool
 The Hulk
 Iron Man
 Mary Jane Watson
 Psylocke
 The Thing
 Thor
 Ultron
 Venom
 Wolverine

Television
 Buffy the Vampire Slayer 
 G.I. Joe: A Real American Hero
 Goliath from Gargoyles 
 The Muppets from The Muppet Show

Video games
 Diablo III 
 Lara Croft and the Guardian of Light 
 Tomb Raider: Legend 
 Tomb Raider: Underworld 
 Uncharted 3: Drake's Deception

Additional statues

 Dinosauria series, including Triceratops, Apatosaurus and Gastonia.

See also
 Iron Studios
 Funko

References

External links
 
 Fan forum

1990s toys
2000s toys
Toy companies of the United States
Toys based on comics
Toy figurines
1994 establishments in the United States